Seabreeze Amusement Park (Seabreeze) is a historic family amusement park located in Irondequoit, New York, a suburb of Rochester, where Irondequoit Bay meets Lake Ontario.  According to the National Amusement Park Historical Association (NAPHA), Seabreeze is the fourth-oldest operating amusement park in the United States and the thirteenth-oldest operating amusement park in the world, having opened in 1879.  The park features roller coasters, a variety of other rides, a midway, and a water park.

History 
In the 1870s, the lakeshore of Lake Ontario became a tourist destination for residents of the city of Rochester.  Several hotels opened at the port of Charlotte and along Irondequoit Bay to entertain summer visitors, and rail lines were built from the city to both destinations.  In 1879, the Rochester and Lake Ontario Railroad Company built a line from Portland Avenue in Rochester to the Sea Breeze neighborhood at the inlet of the bay.  The company purchased fifty acres to open a resort for picnicking and other summer activities, which opened to the public on August 5, 1879.

The Rochester and Lake Ontario Railroad went bankrupt in 1899 and was reorganized as the Rochester and Suburban Railway.  Facing competition from other amusement parks along the bay and lakeshore, the company began adding carnival attractions, and in 1903 the first permanent ride, a figure-eight roller coaster, was built in the park.  By the 1920s, Sea Breeze featured several permanent attractions, including roller coasters, dance halls, a Philadelphia Toboggan Company carousel, and the Natatorium, a large outdoor saltwater pool.  The Natatorium was claimed to be the largest saltwater pool in the world at the time of construction. Fires were a frequent problem and several rides and buildings burned down during this era. 

Sea Breeze was forced to downsize during the Great Depression, and the trolley line to the park, now owned by New York State Railways, was closed in 1936.  George W. Long Jr. began renting the park from New York State Railways in 1937, and purchased it in 1946, changing the name to Dreamland Park.  Long added several rides, including a log flume.

Long retired in 1975 and was succeeded by his grandson, Robert Norris, as president.  Norris renamed the park Seabreeze and launched another wave of additions and improvements to attract families and compete with the new Darien Lake theme park in Corfu, New York. A water park was opened in 1986 and expanded in 2001.  The park's carousel was destroyed in another fire in 1994 and restored two years later.

During the COVID-19 Pandemic, Seabreeze remained closed for the entire 2020 season. Operations resumed during the 2021 season.

Rides and Attractions 
Seabreeze features 25 amusement park rides and water park.  The amusement park is home to a variety of roller coasters and rides, food concessions, midway games, an arcade, a museum, live entertainment, and picnic areas.  The water park features a variety of waterslides, a lazy river, spraygrounds, a wave pool, sunbathing areas, a bathhouse, a retail location, and food outlets.

Amusement Rides

Waterpark Attractions

Shows, Retail & Museum

The Jack Rabbit 

The star attraction at Seabreeze is the Jack Rabbit, an "out-and-back" wooden roller coaster built in 1920.  It is the fourth oldest operating roller coaster in the world and second oldest in the USA.  Currently, is America's oldest continuously operating roller coaster.  The Jack Rabbit celebrated its 100th anniversary in 2020.

Former Rides and Attractions 
 Banzai Pipeline : A 5-story drop body waterslide. Removed in 2011 and replaced by Hydro Racer. Manufactured by ProSlide (SpeedSlide model).
 Bermuda Triangle : A collection of three similar body slides that twisted around each other; two regular body slides (Zoom Flume and Radical Run) and the Banzai Pipeline. Removed in 2011 and replaced by Hydro Racer.
 Bunny Rabbit : A steel kiddie roller coaster manufactured by Allen Herschell Company. Operated from 1985 to 1996 and replaced by Bear Trax.
 Crazy Cups : An old fashioned version the Tea Cups ride. Removed in 2011 and replaced by Twirl'in Tea Cups.
 Figure Eight : This was Seabreeze Amusement Park's first roller coaster. Opening in 1903, this roller coaster was designed by Fredrick Ingersoll at a cost of $20,000.  The ride featured individual cars with upholstered leather seats, finished in cream and maroon colors.  The ride was located just to the south of where the Jack Rabbit's station is today.  The coaster was of a side-friction design.  It closed at the end of the 1915 season and was removed in the winter of 1915–1916.
 Flying Scooters : A predecessor to the current Seabreeze Flyers. The design and location of the ride were almost exactly the same.
 Ghost Train : Another one of the rides burnt beyond repair in the 1994 fire. The ride consisted of powered carts that moved past low light spooky scenes inside a small show building.  The ride was re-themed to the Enchanter in the 1970s.
 Greyhound : A wooden side-friction design wooden roller coaster. Opened in 1916 as "Dips", but renamed for no known reason in 1926 to Greyhound. Closed in 1933.
 Gyrosphere : An indoor scrambler ride with laser effects and music. Removed in 2007 and replaced by Music Express. Manufactured by Eli Bridge Company (Scrambler model).
 Over the Falls : A predecessor to the current log flume, open from 1958 to 1984.
 Paratrooper : A circular ride with swinging gondolas connected along a frame. When the ride starts, the frame spins at about a 45 degree angle, sending the gondolas for a fling.
 Quantum Loop : A steel looping roller coaster manufactured by Soquet. Opened in 1994 after the fire at the park's north end destroyed many of the park's other rides. The ride consisted of an almost six story climb, then dropped down to rush through two consecutive vertical loops and then went through a few turns before hitting the final brake run. The ride had yellow painted track and white painted supports. The ride was removed in 2003 to be replaced by Whirlwind. After removal, Seabreeze sold the ride to Salitre Magico in Colombia where it still operates as Double Loop.
 Radical Run : body slide that was part of the Bermuda Triangle.
 Round up : A ride that consisted of a circular rotating platform that kept riders stuck to the wall using g-forces while the platform raised to a more vertical position.
 Wild Cat : A wooden roller coaster designed by Herbert Paul Schmeck and built by Philadelphia Toboggan Coasters. The Wild Cat was located in the large ravine that bisects the park, where the Log Flume is located today.  Wild Cat operated from 1926 to 1935.
 WipeOut! : twin racing tubular waterslides. Removed in 2005 and replaced by Helix.
 Yo-Yo : A swing ride that simply raised the chairs and spun in circles. Removed in 2013 and replaced by Wave Swinger. Manufactured by Chance Rides (Yoyo model).
 Zoom Flume : body slide that was part of the Bermuda Triangle.

References

External links 
Official Seabreeze website
NAPHA FAQ listing historical parks and rides

Seabreeze at Visit Rochester

Amusement parks in New York (state)
Culture of Rochester, New York
1879 establishments in New York (state)
Tourist attractions in Monroe County, New York
Buildings and structures in Monroe County, New York